Clifford "Cliff" Eccles (born  in Warrington) is a professional rugby league footballer who played in the 1980s, 1990s and 2000s.

Eccles was signed to Salford at the start of the 1994 season from Rochdale Hornets by the then head coach Gary Jack, and went on to play a key role in the side that achieved Grand Final Success at Old Trafford, and then went on to have success in the Super League under the guidance of former Wigan player Andy Gregory.

Gregory masterminded the downfall of the great Wigan side that had visited Wembley eight times; Wigan were favourites in the quarter final at The Willows, Salford, Gregory had different ideas and his side ended the 8-year stronghold Wigan had on the Challenge Cup.

Salford were then beaten by St Helens in the semi-final.

Gregory's team made three Challenge Cup semi-final appearances but never quite stepped up to reach the Wembley Final, the most memorable being at Headingley Stadium against the Sheffield Eagles, with minutes to go Salford were in charge of the game, Gregory decided to replace Cliff Eccles and Andy Platt in the front row, this proved to be his tactical downfall as the Sheffield Eagles went on to score tries in the very gaps that the two strong front rowers had left in the defensive line.

The Sheffield Eagles went on to win the game and beat the Wigan Warriors in the Wembley Final.

Eccles held the record at the Salford Reds for most consecutive appearances by a forward at 103 without missing a game over four seasons including Super League and Challenge Cup Games.

Cliff left the Salford Reds before the start of the 1999 season to join former Salford player turned coach Mike Gregory in his first head coaching role at Swinton Lions.

Eccles stayed with Gregory at Swinton for one season and then joined the Widnes Vikings with Colin Whitfield as head coach; after one season Eccles retired from the game with damaged knee ligaments.

International honours
Cliff Eccles won caps for Ireland while at the Salford City Reds 1997–1998 1-cap + 2-caps (sub).

References

External links
Statistics at rugby.widnes.tv

1967 births
Living people
Blackpool Borough players
English people of Irish descent
English rugby league players
Ireland national rugby league team players
Rochdale Hornets players
Rugby league players from Warrington
Rugby league second-rows
Rugby league props
Salford Red Devils players
Swinton Lions players
Widnes Vikings players